Pristimantis alalocophus is a species of frog in the family Strabomantidae.
It is endemic to Colombia.
Its natural habitats are tropical moist montane forests and rivers.

References

alalocophus
Endemic fauna of Colombia
Amphibians of Colombia
Amphibians of the Andes
Amphibians described in 1991
Taxonomy articles created by Polbot